Grewelthorpe is a village and civil parish in the Harrogate district of North Yorkshire, England situated  south of Masham and  north of Ripon. It is located in the Nidderdale area of outstanding natural beauty.

The name Grewelthorpe derives from the words Gruel and Thorpe, Gruel being a family name and thorpe meaning "outlying farmstead".

Grewelthorpe was mentioned in the Domesday Book when it was known as Torp and was in the ownership of Gospatric.

In 2009 Grewelthorpe has one active church, St James's and a pub, the Crown. It also has a duck pond, which is a distinctive feature of the village, it is populated by ducks which people come from surrounding villages to feed.

The local primary school is known as Grewelthorpe Church of England Primary school and takes children from two years old to eleven years old.  The current school building was opened in June 2003 and is located at cross hills in Grewelthorpe. However, Grewelthorpe has had a school since 1876.

Unlike many Yorkshire villages Grewelthorpe does not currently have a cricket club.  It last had one in the 1950s, but it folded as a result of the failure to find a suitable playing field.

Hackfall

On the edge of the village of Grewelthorpe is Hack Fall Wood, otherwise known as Hackfall, which is a Grade I Garden in English Heritage's Register of Historic Parks and Gardens. Although it appears to be a natural wood, the landscape that can be seen today was in large part a result of design and work undertaken by the Aislabies of Studley Royal.  In Victorian times it was a popular attraction: there are grottos, surprise views, waterfalls, a fountain and several follies, including Mowbray Castle, a ruin in a prominent hill-top position.

After a long period of neglect, restoration has been undertaken in the 1980s by the Hackfall Trust and the Woodland Trust, with the help of a grant from the Heritage Lottery Fund and a 999-year lease. Hackfall is open to the public.

A seventeen and a half mile walking circuit has been created that links Hackfall with Studley Royal called the Aislabie Walk.

References

External links

 Grewelthorpe North Yorkshire Village Web Site
 Hackfall Wood
 The Aislabie Walk
 St James Church

Villages in North Yorkshire
Civil parishes in North Yorkshire
Folly castles in England